McGee is a hamlet in Pleasant Valley Rural Municipality No. 288, Saskatchewan, Canada. It previously held the status of a village until December 31, 1955.

Along with D'Arcy, Saskatchewan, the town is named after the Father of Confederation, D'Arcy McGee.

History
Prior to December 31, 1955, McGee was incorporated as a village, and was restructured as a hamlet under the jurisdiction of the Rural municipality of Pleasant Valley on that date.

See also

List of communities in Saskatchewan
Hamlets of Saskatchewan

References

Pleasant Valley No. 288, Saskatchewan
Former villages in Saskatchewan
Unincorporated communities in Saskatchewan
Division No. 12, Saskatchewan